Ahmad Ahmadi (1885–1944), known as Pezeshk Ahmadi meaning Physician Ahmadi, was born in Mashhad to Mohammad Ali Ahmadi. He worked as a nurse at Qasr prison in Tehran, where he was ordered to kill political prisoners; he was later executed for these crimes.

Crimes 
While he was employed at Tehran's Qasr prison, he was ordered to kill numerous political prisoners. Many political prisoners died under his notorious air injections. Some of the more famous were Mirza Mohammad Farrokhi Yazdi, Abdolhossein Teymourtash, Sardar As'ad and his brother Khānbābā Khān As'ad, Taghi Arani, and Ayatollah Mirza Mohammad Najafi Khorasani (Ayatollah Aghazadeh).

When the allies stormed into Iran in 1941, Rezā Shāh of the Pahlavi Dynasty was overthrown, and the judiciary, headed by Jalāl Abdeh, under popular pressure, was appointed to take many infamous figures such as Ahmadi to trial for their notorious crimes during the first Pahlavi era.

Trial and execution 
After being released from exile in 1941, Iran Teymourtash travelled to Iraq and succeeded in arranging for Ahmadi's extradition to Iran on charges that he had killed her father, Abdolhossein Teymourtash.

Ahmadi, along with Sarpās Mokhtār (Central Police Chief), Mostafā Rāsekh, and Hosein Niroumand, were arrested and sentenced for crimes committed during Rezā Shāh's reign.

Ahmadi was found guilty for numerous murders by the court and was sentenced to death. He was executed in public in 1944 in Tehran's Toopkhāneh Square.

See also
Amir Abdollah Tahmasebi
Abdolhossein Teymourtash
Mahmud Khan Puladeen
Colonel Pessian

References
ايران در سه قرن گذشته (Iran in the Last Three Centuries) by Alireza Avsati. Published Tehran, 2003. Vol. 1  Vol. 2 
 These Three Women: Ashraf Pahlavi, Mariam Firouz, and Iran Teymourtash, (EEn Se Zan") by Massoud Behnoud.

1885 births
1939 murders in Iran
1940 murders in Iran
1941 murders in Iran
1942 murders in Iran 
1944 deaths
1940s murders in Iran
1930s murders in Iran
Executed Iranian people
Executed serial killers
Iranian nurses
Iranian people convicted of murder
Iranian serial killers
Male serial killers
Medical practitioners convicted of murdering their patients
Medical serial killers
People convicted of murder by Iran
People executed by Pahlavi Iran
People from Mashhad